Royal Wootton Bassett , formerly Wootton Bassett, is a market town and civil parish in Wiltshire, England, with a population of 13,570 at the 2021 Census.

From 1447 until 1832 Wootton Bassett was a parliamentary borough which elected two Members of Parliament (MPs) to the House of Commons.  In 1832 it was deemed a rotten borough and abolished by the Great Reform Act.

The town was granted royal patronage in March 2011 by Elizabeth II in recognition of its role in the early-21st-century military funeral repatriations, which passed through the town. This honour was officially conferred in a ceremony on 16 October 2011 – the first royal patronage to be conferred upon a town (as distinguished from a borough or county) since 1909.

History

Wodeton settlement

AD 681 is usually taken as the starting point for recorded history of Wootton Bassett, then known as Wodeton, it being referred to in that year in a Malmesbury Abbey charter granting land to the Abbot.

Archaeological discoveries in the area tend to confirm the tradition that the original "Wodeton" (Settlement in the wood – i.e. in Bradon Forest) was near the present Dunnington Road. Allegedly under continuous occupation throughout Celtic and Romano-British periods, the land was granted in 681 AD to Malmesbury Abbey. Further grants of land nearby appear in the records from time to time, but of Wodeton itself we hear no more until it was sacked by the marauding Danes in 1015, whereupon the survivors decided to move uphill to the site of the present High Street.

Domesday Book
It was said to be worth nine pounds.

Royal status
In the early 21st century, the town paid informal tributes during military repatriation funeral processions which passed through the town, eventually attracting significant media coverage. On 16 March 2011, Prime Minister David Cameron announced, at the start of Prime Minister's Questions, that while "from September, military repatriations will no longer pass through the town of Wootton Bassett", "Her Majesty has agreed to confer the title 'Royal' upon the town, as an enduring symbol of the nation’s admiration and gratitude". The addition to the town's name was enacted through Letters Patent and became effective on 16 October 2011, when The Princess Royal visited the town to present formally the Letters Patent to the town council. Royal Wootton Bassett has become the third Royal town in the country after Royal Leamington Spa and Royal Tunbridge Wells, and the first to receive the status in over 100 years.

Geography

Suburbs of Royal Wootton Bassett include Noremarsh, Coped Hall, Woodshaw and Vastern (a small hamlet to the south). Bishop Fowley is shown on Andrews' and Dury's Map of Wiltshire, 1810 as being an outlying hamlet southwest of the town; the location is now known as Vowley Farm.

Wootton Bassett Mud Spring is a  geological Site of Special Scientific Interest, which was notified in 1997.

Governance
The first tier of local government is Royal Wootton Bassett Town Council, with 16 members elected by voters in three wards. Councillors elect one of their number to serve as mayor for a period of one year.

The town falls under the auspices of Wiltshire Council, a unitary authority established in 2009 as part of wider local government changes in England. In the national government, since the 1997 general election the town has been represented by the Conservative MP James Gray, as the elected member for the North Wiltshire parliament constituency.

Royal Wootton Bassett is twinned with Blain in western France.

The original Wootton Bassett UK Parliamentary constituency was abolished in 1832. The right of the town to send two representatives to Parliament was first gained as early as 1446 and before the Reform Act 1832, Wootton Bassett was known as a Rotten Borough due to the way in which elections were conducted, which were the antithesis of modern democratic elections. Voters were required to state their preferences in public before representatives of each side, and were openly bribed. In 1754 the accounts of a successful candidate show that his supporters were paid £30 each for their vote, and in the run up to the election the candidates secured the allegiance of public houses in the town, where voters were plied with free refreshments. Free beer was also provided by men who carried containers about the town. The same accounts show that £1,077 was paid out to 12 pubs for the refreshments.

Population

The United Kingdom Census 2001 recorded the town's population as 11,043, indicating that the town tripled in population total during the previous 50 years. Since the opening of the M4 motorway, the town has become attractive to commuters, many travelling to the towns and cities of Swindon, Chippenham, Bath and Bristol. The town also has a significant Royal Air Force population due to its proximity to MoD Lyneham, which is now largely a training establishment but until 2012 was the site of RAF Lyneham.

Education

Royal Wootton Bassett has a secondary school, Royal Wootton Bassett Academy, which in a 2013 Ofsted inspection was assessed as "outstanding" in every category.

There are four primary schools: St Bartholomew's Primary Academy (formerly C of E Primary School), Longleaze Primary School, Noremarsh Junior School and Wootton Bassett Infants’ School.

The town is also home to detachments of the Army Cadet Force and the Sea Cadets.

Economy
The town has always been a market town, and hence with many trades associated with farming and agriculture.

In 1908 Wiltshire United Dairies built a dairy and creamery in the town. Merged in 1916 to form United Dairies, in 1931 a private siding was opened from Wootton Bassett Junction railway station to allow milk trains to service the plant. Merged into Unigate in 1958, the plant became a key production site for the St Ivel Shape brand yoghurts, before being sold to Danone for £32m. The factory consequently closed in February 2003. The site was sold for £19m in August 2004, and the factory demolished in June 2005. It was redeveloped as the Beaufort Park housing estate.

Disclosure and Barring Service has an office in the town.

Repatriations

From April 2007, the bodies of servicemen and women of the British Armed Forces killed in Iraq and Afghanistan were repatriated to RAF Lyneham 4.5 miles (7.5 km) to the south. The bodies would then be transported to John Radcliffe Hospital, Oxford, in coffins covered with a Union Flag, passing through the town on their way. In the summer of 2007, local members of The Royal British Legion became aware of the repatriation, and decided to formally show their respect to the soldiers as they passed through their town.  This led to other people assembling along the route, with large gatherings of sometimes over 1,000 people. After runway repairs at RAF Brize Norton had been completed, the RAF continued to use Lyneham, a Ministry of Defence spokesman saying that because the "people of Wootton Bassett had done such a lot to lend their support, it was felt it would be insensitive to transfer the process back to Brize." When RAF Lyneham closed in September 2011, the repatriations moved to RAF Brize Norton and go near to the town of Carterton.

Tributes
In October 2008, an Armed Forces parade was held in the town. On Friday 29 January 2010 the town was visited by The Prince of Wales and his wife The Duchess of Cornwall, to lay a wreath at the War Memorial and meet local people. On 21 December 2009, Prince William presented the town with one of The Sun's "Millie" awards for Support to the Armed Forces, stating: "One of the most remarkable things is that the people are so modest, they refuse to accept any praise".

In May 2009, The Royal British Legion honoured Wootton Bassett with a special award in recognition of Legion members, many of whom are ex-servicemen and women, who attend the repatriations. Motorcyclists from The Royal British Legion Riders Branch attended repatriations held in the town.

Calls for the town to have Royal status bestowed on it had emerged in September 2009 and, while in the form of petitions and social media campaigns there had been public support for both the Royal title and other forms of national expressions of thanks at the time, local figures were less keen on the idea. South Wootton Bassett councillor Chris Wannell and Wootton Bassett Mayor Steve Bucknell both thought that it was not what local people would want, preferring to just honour the dead with no expectation of thanks.

Other tributes have included a public mass charity motorcycle parade through the town in March 2010, which also raised £100,000 for the charity Afghan Heroes. In 2011, the community of Royal Wootton Bassett themselves made a less sombre tribute as they came together over 5 months to re-record the classic Green Day track, "Wake Me Up When September Ends" from their American Idiot album, in aid of military charities. The project was called "Wootton Bassett Rocks", and its aim was to raise £1million for  four charities: The Royal British Legion, Combat Stress, The Undentable Trust, and Soldiers, Sailors, Airmen & Families Association (SSAFA). The single was made available for download and on DVD in November 2011. It climbed the rock charts in several countries.

Protests
In 2009, the far-right English Defence League visited Wootton Bassett, after plans for a demonstration in the town by the Muslim extremist group Islam4UK, led by Anjem Choudary, came under widespread condemnation. The group eventually called off the plan, claiming that the publicity generated had "successfully highlighted the plight of Muslims in Afghanistan" and so "no more could be achieved even if a procession were to take place".

Arms of Royal Wootton Bassett

An official coat of arms was granted to Wootton Bassett Town Council, by Letters Patent of Garter, Clarenceux and Norroy and Ulster Kings of Arms, on 30 August 2011, the day before the date of the Queen's Patent granting the designation "Royal" to the town. The town had previously used unofficial Arms consisting of a chevron between three lozenges: the granted design adapts this to reflect the Royal favour accorded in recognition of the town's role in recent repatriations of fallen servicemen and women, and is: Gules a Chevron Argent between in chief two Lozenges and in base a Lion passant guardant Or. The lion passant is a visible heraldic sign of the royal favour.

Transport

Road
The main road through the town is the A3102, which connects it to Swindon to the east and Melksham to the south-west, a town in the west of the county. The only other numbered road out of the town is the B4042, which runs to Malmesbury in the west. The town is also close to Junction 16 of the M4 motorway connecting London with South Wales, allowing easy access to other towns and cities of the M4 corridor.

Rail

Royal Wootton Bassett has no railway station, although it has been served in the past by Wootton Bassett Road and Wootton Bassett Junction stations, and is a major junction on the rail network, being the location where the South Wales Main Line branches off of the Great Western Main Line. Thus stations nearby offer direct connections to London, the South West and South Wales.

The first station to serve the town was Wootton Bassett Road, opened by the Great Western Railway (GWR) in 1840 some distance from the town (and sometimes referred to as Hay Lane), when the Great Western Main Line from  reached the town. After just a year, with the completion of the Box Tunnel allowing the line to reach , this was replaced by the closer Wootton Bassett railway station. In 1903, after the South Wales line opened, the station was demolished and rebuilt as Wootton Bassett Junction at the junction of the two lines. British Railways closed that station in 1965. There have been ongoing attempts to re-open a station in the early 21st century. Commuters wishing to use train services would have to travel to Swindon or Chippenham for regular services to London and the West Country; a bus service runs from Chippenham to Swindon via the town to allow these journeys to be made via public transport.

Canal

The route of the former Wilts & Berks Canal passes through Royal Wootton Bassett parish, south of the town. The canal reached here from Semington in 1801 and was completed when it reached Abingdon in 1810. The last narrowboat traffic to Wootton Bassett was in 1906 and the canal was abandoned by Act of Parliament in 1914. The canal is now being restored by the Wilts & Berks Canal Trust.

Culture

Arts and theatre
The town has an Arts Festival celebrating music, speech and drama with events in June and November.

Wootton Bassett Theatre is at the Angel Hotel, and teaches classes as well as putting on performances.

Sport
In football, the town is represented by Wootton Bassett Town F.C. who play their home games at the 2,000-capacity Gerard Buxton Sports Ground. Other sports clubs include Wootton Bassett Hockey Club, Wootton Bassett Otters Swimming Club, Wootton Bassett Rugby Football Club and Wootton Bassett Bowls Club.

In summer 2015, the Gerard Buxton Sports Ground re-located from Rylands Way to the north side of the Brinkworth Road, just outside the town but walkable and cyclable from most parts.  The site is held by Trustees and is known overall as Royal Wootton Bassett Sports Association. It is run almost exclusively by volunteers from the participating sports clubs. Initially these were RWB Cricket Club, Hounds (running), the Tennis Club and the Town Football Club; they were joined in 2017 by the North Thames Boules Club (now the Royal Wootton Bassett Petanque Club). The main building hosts changing facilities, a bar and tuck shop, kitchen area, meeting and function rooms.

Museums
The Wootton Bassett Museum is the former town hall, which is an upper storey supported on 15 pillars. It was built at the end of the 17th century, a gift from the Hyde family (Earls of Clarendon).

War memorial

The town previously had war memorials in the form of a memorial garden in the cemetery and the memorial hall on Tinker's Field. In October 2004 a new memorial was unveiled in the town, a simple pedestal topped by a bronze of hands holding up a globe. The opening was the culmination of a five-year publicity and fund raising campaign, initiated by local resident Jay Cunningham who felt that the garden and hall were not prominent enough. The design of the memorial was by Lance Corporal Alan Wilson of the Wootton Bassett Army Cadet Force, chosen by public vote, and then sculpted by local artist Vivien ap Rhys Price.

Freedom of the Town
The following people and military units have received the Freedom of the Town of Royal Wootton Bassett.

Individuals
 Johnathan Dudley Bourne: 29 July 2022.

References

Further reading

External links

 

 
Market towns in Wiltshire
Towns in Wiltshire
Civil parishes in Wiltshire
Wootton Bassett